Roberto Cabañas González (11 April 1961 – 9 January 2017) was a Paraguayan footballer who played as a forward.

Career
During his career, Cabañas played for Cerro Porteño of Paraguay, Stade Brestois and Olympique Lyonnais of France, the New York Cosmos (winning the 1980 and 1982 NASL championship and top scorer and NASL MVP in 1983), América de Cali of Colombia (helping the team in reaching three consecutive Copa Libertadores finals) and Boca Juniors of Argentina (winning the 1992 Apertura tournament and the 1992 Copa Master de Supercopa).

After representing Paraguay at the 1979 FIFA World Youth Championship, Cabañas became a key player of the Paraguay national team during the 1980s. Cabañas was not only pivotal in Paraguay's qualification for the Mexico 1986 World Cup, but he also scored the two goals against Belgium in the pivotal third group match, thus tying the game at 2-2. This allowed Paraguay to qualify second in their group, behind Mexico.

After retiring, Cabañas settled in Cali, Colombia, where he married and had two children.

Cabañas died of a heart attack in Asunción in January 2017, Paraguay. He was 55.

References

External links
 
 
 rsssf

1961 births
2017 deaths
People from Ñeembucú Department
Paraguayan footballers
Paraguayan expatriate footballers
Cerro Porteño players
América de Cali footballers
Stade Brestois 29 players
Olympique Lyonnais players
Boca Juniors footballers
New York Cosmos players
Club Libertad footballers
Expatriate footballers in Argentina
Expatriate footballers in France
Expatriate footballers in Ecuador
Expatriate footballers in Colombia
Expatriate soccer players in the United States
Paraguayan expatriate sportspeople in Argentina
Paraguayan expatriate sportspeople in France
Paraguayan expatriate sportspeople in Ecuador
Paraguayan expatriate sportspeople in Colombia
Paraguayan expatriate sportspeople in the United States
North American Soccer League (1968–1984) players
Paraguayan Primera División players
Argentine Primera División players
Ligue 1 players
Ligue 2 players
Categoría Primera A players
Ecuadorian Serie A players
Paraguay under-20 international footballers
Paraguay international footballers
Copa América-winning players
1979 Copa América players
1986 FIFA World Cup players
1987 Copa América players
1993 Copa América players
América de Cali managers
Association football forwards
Paraguayan football managers
20th-century Paraguayan people
21st-century Paraguayan people